Chris Iheuwa is a Nigerian actor, film maker and one of the pioneers of Nollywood industry.  He is the vice chairman of Actors Guild of Nigeria. He is known for his roles in Rattle Snake (1995), Phone Swap (2012), Joba (2019), The Second Bed (2020), La Femme Anjola (2020), Stranger (2022).

Education 
He obtained his first degree  from Theatre Arts at the University of Ibadan and Masters degree in University of Lagos.

Kidnapping controversy 
Iheuwa was nearly kidnapped in 2021. He was deceived to a unknown location in Port Harcourt where he was eventually rescued by the police.

Filmography

References 

Nigerian film directors
Nigerian film producers
20th-century Nigerian male actors
University of Lagos alumni
University of Lagos people
University of Ibadan alumni
21st-century Nigerian male actors
Nigerian male film actors
Year of birth missing (living people)
Living people